Ahmet Turan Emeksiz (11 November 1940 – 28 April 1960) was a Turkish university student who was killed in 1960 street demonstrations.

Life 
Emeksiz was born in Gündüzbey village  of Yeşilyurt district, Malatya Province  in 1940. After high school in Malatya, he studied in the Forestry school of Istanbul University. On 28 April 1960 he took part in a student demonstration against the Committee of Inquest a new super-power committee established by the Democrat Party (DP) government. During the demonstrations he was killed by a police bullet. The police department claimed that the bullet which killed Emeksiz was a bounced bullet. But the issue was not resolved for more than 50 years. Finally in 2013 it was officially reported that the bullet was intentionally aimed at Emeksiz.

Legacy 
Although he was not a political figure, he became a symbol of DP government's last days. One commuter boat  serving in Bosphorous  was named after Turan Emeksiz. This boat is now  used as a restaurant in Mudanya. In Malatya, a highschool was named Turan Emeksiz Lisesi; but in 1980s the school was renamed as Malatya Lisesi  The newer section of Karabucak Forest in Tarsus is also named after him. He has two busts one in Istanbul and one in Malatya.

References 

1940 births
1960 deaths
Istanbul University alumni
1960 in Turkey
People from Yeşilyurt, Malatya
Burials at Cebeci Asri Cemetery
1960 murders in Turkey